The Dartmouth–Harvard football rivalry is an American college football rivalry between the Dartmouth Big Green and Harvard Crimson. The series began in 1882 and is considered one of the fifteen oldest rivalries in College football. Since the formation of the Ivy League in 1954, the annual game has been a key decider in the crowning of the league's champion. Dartmouth has captured a league-record 19 Ivy League championships, while the Crimson have obtained 17 titles, tied for third-most. Furthermore, since the start of round-robin play, Harvard and Dartmouth have posted the first- and second-best league winning percentages at 0.628 and 0.606 respectively.

The rivalry was initially dominated by Harvard, with the Crimson owning a spot among the predominant collegiate programs of the era, capturing 12 national championships (7 claimed) recognized by NCAA-designated major selectors, all won prior to 1920. As a result, the upstart Big Green were unable to score until 1900, or to win until 1903, which came at the dedication of Harvard Stadium. In 1908, Harvard's Johnny Cutler won the game in the last few minutes. Dartmouth entered its own dominant period beginning in 1934, winning 15 of 19 contests, including their first victory at home in Hanover in 1955. The two teams entered a hotly-contested few decades of games, before Harvard seized the advantage in the late 1990s, winning an unprecedented 20 of 21 games. However, Dartmouth's recent resurgence in 2010s have led to several league championships and victories over Harvard, including a dramatic finish in the 2019 contest. Trailing 6 to 3 and needing a victory to keep their championship hopes alive, the Big Green's Derek Kyler connected with Masaki Aerts on a game-concluding Hail Mary pass, sealing a 9-6 victory.

Game results

See also 
 List of NCAA college football rivalry games
 List of most-played college football series in NCAA Division I

References

College football rivalries in the United States
Dartmouth Big Green football
Harvard Crimson football